The eighth season of CSI: Crime Scene Investigation premiered on CBS on September 27, 2007, and ended May 15, 2008. The season stars William Petersen and Marg Helgenberger.

Plot
As the CSIs race to save one of their own ("Dead Doll"), Sara makes a life-changing decision ("Goodbye and Good Luck"), and one investigator falls ("For Gedda"), in the eighth season of CSI. Grissom, Willows and their team investigate the death of go-kart racer ("A La Cart"), a demonic possession ("Go to Hell"), the death of a hermaphrodite ("The Case of the Cross-Dressing Carp"), the murder of a slasher film actress ("The Chick Chop Flick Shop"), and a kidnapping that brings New York's top FBI agent to Las Vegas ("Who and What"). Meanwhile, Catherine finds herself affected by the death of a three-year-old ("A Thousand Days on Earth"), and the death of a difficult TV star leads Brass and Grissom to Hollywood ("Two and a Half Deaths").

Cast

Main cast

 William Petersen as Gil Grissom, a CSI Level 3 Supervisor
 Marg Helgenberger as Catherine Willows, a CSI Level 3 Assistant Supervisor
 Gary Dourdan as Warrick Brown, a CSI Level 3
 George Eads as Nick Stokes, a CSI Level 3
 Jorja Fox as Sara Sidle, a CSI Level 3 (episodes 1–7)
 Eric Szmanda as Greg Sanders, a CSI Level 2
 Robert David Hall as Al Robbins, the Chief Medical Examiner
 Wallace Langham as David Hodges, a Trace Technician
 Paul Guilfoyle as Jim Brass, a Homicide Detective Captain

Recurring cast

Guest cast

 Louise Lombard as Sofia Curtis
 Jessie Collins as Natalie Davis
 Anthony LaPaglia as Jack Malone 
 Method Man as Drops
 Katey Sagal as Annabelle Fundt

Cameo appearances

 Jamie Hyneman ("The Theory of Everything")
 Adam Savage ("The Theory of Everything")
 Charlie Sheen ("Two and a Half Deaths")
 Jon Cryer ("Two and a Half Deaths")
 Angus T. Jones ("Two and a Half Deaths")

Changes
Louise Lombard departed the cast after the first episode of the season, while Jorja Fox signed on for only the first seven episodes. This is the final full season to star Gary Dourdan and William Petersen, and the last season to feature every original main cast member in a starring role. Wallace Langham joined the main cast.

Production 
Only 11 episodes had been completed and aired before the 2007 Writers Guild of America strike. Only six more episodes were made after the strike, for a total of only 17 episodes. Some international broadcasters only showed the first part of the crossover "Who and What" because Without a Trace did not air (or aired older seasons) at the time.

Episodes

References

08
2007 American television seasons
2008 American television seasons

es:Me matas